The following is an alphabetical list of topics related to the Republic of Peru.

0–9

.pe – Internet country code top-level domain for Peru
100% Fanáticos

A
Administrative divisions of Peru
Agricultural history of Peru
Air Force of Peru
Airports in Peru
Alliance for the Future
Amazonas Region
American Popular Revolutionary Alliance (APRA)
Americas
South America
Islands of Peru
South Pacific Ocean
Ancash Region
Ancient civilizations of Peru
Andes
Apurímac Region
Architecture of Peru
Arequipa Region
Army of Peru
Atlas of Peru
Ayacucho Region

B
Battles of the Peruvian Navy
Biosphere reserves in Peru
Birds of Peru
Bolsa de Valores de Lima

C
Cabinet of Peru
Cajamarca Region
Callao Region
Capital of Peru: Lima
Categories:
:Category:Peru
:Category:Buildings and structures in Peru
:Category:Communications in Peru
:Category:Economy of Peru
:Category:Education in Peru
:Category:Environment of Peru
:Category:Geography of Peru
:Category:Government of Peru
:Category:Health in Peru
:Category:History of Peru
:Category:Law of Peru
:Category:Military of Peru
:Category:Peru portal
:Category:Peru-related lists
:Category:Peruvian culture
:Category:Peruvian people
:Category:Politics of Peru
:Category:Science and technology in Peru
:Category:Society of Peru

:Category:Transportation in Peru
commons:Category:Peru
Ccotalaca
Ccotaña
Ccotanca
Ccotancaire
Ccotapampa
Ccoyo
Ccuelluccasa
Ccullco
Central Reserve Bank of Peru
Cinema of Peru
Cities of Peru
Largest cities of Peru
Climate of Peru
Coat of arms of Peru
Colombia-Peru War
Communications in Peru
Companies of Peru
Congresspeople of Peru
Constitution of Peru
Cuisine of Peru
Culture of Peru
Currency of Peru
Cusco Region

D
Democratic Constitutional Congress
Demographic history of Peru
Demographics of Peru
Diplomatic missions in Peru
Diplomatic missions of Peru
Districts of Peru
Districts of Lima

E
Economic history of Peru
Economy of Peru
Ecuador
Ecuadorian–Peruvian War
Education in Peru
Elections in Peru
Electricity sector in Peru
Energy in Peru
Extreme points of Peru

F

Flag of Perú
Flora of Peru
Football in Peru
Foreign relations of Peru

G
Geography of Peru
Geology of Peru
Glaciers of Peru
Government of Peru
Guano era in Peru

H
Healthcare in Peru and universal healthcare (Peru information)
"Himno Nacional del Perú"
Hinduism in Peru
History of Peru
Holidays of Peru
Hospitals in Peru
Hoy con Cesar Hildebrandt, political television programme
Huancavelica Region
Huánuco Region
Huchuy Qosqo, an archaeological site
Human rights in Peru
Huascarán - highest mountain peak in Peru and the entire Tropics

I
Ica Region
Inca Empire
Internal conflict in Peru
International Cervical Cancer Foundation
International Organization for Standardization (ISO)
ISO 3166-1 alpha-2 country code for Peru: PE
ISO 3166-1 alpha-3 country code for Peru: PER
ISO 3166-2:PE region codes for Peru
International rankings of Peru
Internet in Peru
Iperu, tourist information and assistance
Islam in Peru
Islands of Peru

J
Judicial System of Peru
Junín Region

L
La Libertad Region
Lambayeque Region
Languages of Peru
Latin America
Law enforcement in Peru
LGBT rights in Peru
Lima – Capital of Peru
Lima Province
Lima Region
Lists related to Peru:
Diplomatic missions of Peru
List of 15 largest metropolitan areas in Peru
List of 20 largest cities in Peru
List of airports in Peru
List of battles of the Peruvian Navy
List of biosphere reserves in Peru
List of birds of Peru
List of cities in Peru
List of companies of Peru
List of Congresspeople of Peru
List of diplomatic missions in Peru
List of districts of Lima
List of earthquakes in Peru
List of hospitals in Peru
List of islands of Peru
List of mammals in Peru
List of mayors of Lima
List of mountains in Peru
List of national parks in Peru
List of newspapers in Peru
List of people from Lima
List of Peru-related topics
List of Peruvian artists
List of Peruvian companies
List of Peruvian writers
List of Peruvians
List of political parties in Peru
List of postal codes in Peru
List of presidents of Peru
List of prime ministers of Peru
List of rivers of Peru
List of senior officers of the Peruvian Army
List of shopping malls in Peru
List of sites of interest in the Lima Metropolitan area
List of universities in Peru
List of Viceroys of Peru
List of volcanoes in Peru
List of World Heritage Sites in Peru
Regions of Peru
Topic outline of Peru
Literature of Peru
Llama
Loreto Region

M
Machu Picchu
Madre de Dios Region
Malnutrition in Peru
Mammals of Peru
Mañay
Mayors of Lima
Media in Peru
Metropolitan areas of Peru
Military of Peru
Ministry of Defence (Peru)
Monster of Lake Fagua
Moquegua Region
Mountains of Peru
Municipalities of Peru
Music of Peru

N
National anthem of Peru
National parks of Peru
National symbols of Peru
National Unity (Peru) party
Natural regions of Peru
Navy of Peru
Nevado Huascarán
Newspapers in Peru

P
Pacific Ocean
Pasco Region
People from Lima
Peru (Perú)
Peru at the Olympics
Peru Possible party
Peruvian, adjective or noun
Peruvian architecture
Peruvian art
Peruvian artists
Peruvian Cancer Foundation
Peruvian companies
Peruvian Constitution
Peruvian cuisine
Peruvian electoral system
2000 Peruvian general election
2001 Peruvian general election
2006 Peruvian general election
2011 Peruvian general election
2016 Peruvian general election
Peruvian literature
Peruvian Nationalist Party
Peruvian nationality law, 1996
1895 Peruvian presidential election
1899 Peruvian presidential election
Peruvian sol
Peruvian War of Independence
Peruvian writers
Piura Region
Political parties in Peru
Politics of Peru
Popular Action party
Population of Peru
Postal codes in Peru
President of Peru
List of presidents of Peru
Prime Minister of Peru
List of prime ministers of Peru
Prominent Peruvians
Prostitution in Peru
Protected areas of Peru
Provinces of Peru
Public holidays in Peru
Puno Region

R
Rail transport in Peru
Regions of Peru
Religion in Peru
Republic of Peru (República del Perú)
Rivers of Peru

S
San Martín Region
Scouting in Peru
Senate of Peru
Senior officers of the Peruvian Army
Shopping malls in Peru
Sites of interest in the Lima Metropolitan area
South America
Southern Hemisphere
Spanish colonization of the Americas
Spanish conquest of the Inca Empire
Spanish language
Sport in Peru
Stock Exchange of Peru
Subdivisions of Peru
Supreme Court of Peru

T
Tacna Region
Taxation in Peru
Timeline of Peruvian history
Topic outline of Peru
Tourism in Peru
Transport in Peru
Tumbes Region

U
Ucayali Region
Union for Peru party
United Nations founding member state 1945
United States-Peru relations
Universities in Peru

V
Viceroyalty of Peru
List of Viceroys of Peru
Volcanoes of Peru

W
War of the Pacific, 1879–1883
Water supply and sanitation in Peru
Western Hemisphere

Wikipedia:WikiProject Topic outline/Drafts/Topic outline of Peru
World Heritage Sites in Peru

See also

List of international rankings
Lists of country-related topics
Topic outline of geography
Topic outline of Peru
Topic outline of South America
United Nations

External links

 
Peru